Evening Shade School District No. 24 was a school district headquartered in Evening Shade, Arkansas. It had elementary (K-4) and high school (5-12) divisions.

On July 1, 2004, it was annexed into the Cave City School District.

References

Further reading
 Map of Arkansas School Districts pre-July 1, 2004
 (Download)

External links
 
 Sharp County, Arkansas Evening Shade School District No. 24 General Purpose Financial Statements and Other Reports June 30, 2000 
 Evening Shade School District No. 24 Sharp County, Arkansas General Purpose Financial Statements and Other Reports June 30, 2001 
 Evening Shade School District No. 24 Sharp County, Arkansas General Purpose Financial Statements and Other Reports June 30, 2003 

Defunct school districts in Arkansas
Education in Sharp County, Arkansas
2004 disestablishments in Arkansas
School districts disestablished in 2004